Niklaus Schurtenberger (born 7 February 1968) is a Swiss equestrian who competes in the sport of show jumping. He won the bronze medal at the 2008 Summer Olympics in team jumping following the disqualification of Norwegian rider Tony André Hansen.

References

1968 births
Equestrians at the 2008 Summer Olympics
Living people
Olympic bronze medalists for Switzerland
Olympic equestrians of Switzerland
Sportspeople from the canton of Bern
Swiss show jumping riders
Swiss male equestrians
Olympic medalists in equestrian
Medalists at the 2008 Summer Olympics